Nikolai Viktorovich Kormiltsev (born 14 March 1946) was Commander-in-Chief of the Russian Ground Forces from 2001 to 2004, before being replaced by Alexey Maslov.

Biography 
Kormiltsev was born on 14 March 1946 in Omsk, joining the Soviet Army in 1965 and graduating from the Omsk Higher Combined Arms Command School four years later. In 1978, he graduated from the Frunze Military Academy and became a deputy division commander. Kormiltsev later became the division commander, leading it during the Soviet–Afghan War. After returning from Afghanistan, he took command of a district training center in Omsk, part of the Siberian Military District.

In 1990, Kormiltsev graduated from the Military Academy of the General Staff, and became commander of the 36th Army Corps of the Turkestan Military District, which became the shortlived 52nd Army between July 1992 and May 1993. He was appointed to command the 5th Army in 1993.

In November 1994, Kormiltsev became First Deputy Commander of the Transbaikal Military District, taking command of the district in September 1996. When in December 1998, by unifying the Siberian Military District and the Trans-Baikal Military District, a unified Siberian Military District was established with headquarters in Chita, Kormiltsev was appointed commander of the troops of this district. After the Main Command of the Ground Forces was abolished in 1997, he criticized the move and supported the recreation of the Main Command.

In April 2001, the Main Command was reformed, and then-Colonel General Kormiltsev became Commander-in-Chief of the Russian Ground Forces. He simultaneously became a deputy Minister of Defense. On 11 June 2003, he was promoted to Army General. In October 2004, Kormiltsev resigned from his position as a result of a disagreement with Minister of Defense Sergei Ivanov and Chief of the General Staff Yuri Baluyevsky over the next military reform.

References

Generals of the army (Russia)
Commanders-in-chief of the Russian Army
Living people
1946 births
Military personnel from Omsk
Frunze Military Academy alumni
Military Academy of the General Staff of the Armed Forces of the Soviet Union alumni
Deputy Defence Ministers of Russia